Mazovia or Masovia is a historical region in mid-north-eastern Poland. It spans the North European Plain, roughly between Łódź and Białystok, with Warsaw being the unofficial capital and largest city. Throughout the centuries, Mazovia developed a separate sub-culture featuring diverse folk songs, architecture, dress and traditions different from those of other Poles.

Historical Mazovia existed from the Middle Ages until the partitions of Poland and consisted of three voivodeships with the capitals in Warsaw, Płock and Rawa. The main city of the region was Płock, which was even capital of Poland from 1079 to 1138; however, in Early Modern Times Płock lost its importance to Warsaw, which became the capital of Poland. From 1138, Mazovia was governed by a separate branch of the Piast dynasty and when the last ruler of the independent Duchy of Mazovia died, it was fully incorporated to the Polish Crown in 1526. During the Polish–Lithuanian Commonwealth over 20% of Mazovian population was categorized as petty nobility. Between 1816 and 1844, the Mazovian Governorate was established, which encompassed the south of the region along with Łęczyca Land and south-eastern Kuyavia. The former inhabitants of Mazovia are the Masurians, who since the Late Middle Ages settled in neighboring southern Prussia, a region later called Masuria, where they converted to Protestantism in the Reformation era, thus leaving Catholicism, to which their relatives from Mazovia still adhered.

The borders of contemporary Mazovian Voivodeship (province), which was created in 1999, do not exactly reflect the original size of Mazovia, as they do not include the historically Mazovian cities of Łomża and Łowicz, but include the historically Lesser Polish cities of Radom and Siedlce.

Geography

Mazovia has a landscape without hills (in contrast to Lesser Poland) and without lakes (in contrast to Greater Poland). It is spread over the Mazovian Lowland, on both sides of the Vistula river and its confluence with Narew and Bug. Forests (mainly coniferous) cover one-fifth of the region, with the large Kampinos Forest, Puszcza Biała and Puszcza Zielona.

In the north Mazovia borders on the Masurian subregion of former Prussia, in the east on Podlachia, in the south on Lesser Poland and in the west on Greater Poland (subregions of Łęczyca Land, Kujawy and Dobrzyń Land). The area of Mazovia is 33,500 km2. It has population of 5 million (3 million of them inhabit the metropolis of Warsaw).

History
When the Slavs came to this region from the surrounding area of Polesie, they mingled with the descendants of Vistula Veneti and with other people who had settled here such as the Wielbark people. This created a Lechitic tribe: Mazovians.

The historical region of Mazovia (Mazowsze) in the beginning encompassed only the territories on the right bank of Vistula near Płock and had strong connections with Greater Poland (through Włocławek and Kruszwica). In the period of the rule of the first Polish monarchs of the Piast dynasty, Płock was one of their seats, and on the Cathedral Hill (Wzgórze Tumskie) they raised palatium. In the period 1037–1047 it was the capital of the independent, Mazovian state of Masław. Between 1079 and 1138 this city was de facto the capital of Poland. Since 1075 it has been the seat of the Diocese of Płock encompassing northern Mazovia; the south formed the archdeaconate of Czersk belonging to Poznań, and the Duchy of Łowicz was part of the Archdiocese of Gniezno (this division remained as long as until the Partitions of Poland).

During the 9th century Mazovia was perhaps inhabited by the tribe of Mazovians, and it was incorporated into the Polish state in the second half of 10th century under the Piast ruler Mieszko I. As a result of the fragmentation of Poland after the death of Polish monarch Bolesław III Wrymouth, in 1138 the Duchy of Mazovia was established, and during the 12th and 13th centuries it joined temporarily various adjacent lands and endured invasions of Prussians, Yotvingians, and Ruthenians. To protect its northern section Conrad I of Mazovia called in the Teutonic Knights in 1226 and granted them the Chełmno Land.

After the reunification of the Polish state by Władysław I in the early 14th century, Mazovia became its fief in 1351. In the second half of 15th century western Mazovia and in 1526/1529 the main part (with its capital in Warsaw) was incorporated into the Polish state. In the 15th century the eastern part of the region (Łomża) was settled, mainly by the yeomanry (drobna szlachta). Mazovia was considered underdeveloped in comparison with Greater Poland and Lesser Poland, with the lowest urban population.

In the Early Modern Times Mazovia was known for exporting grain, timber, and fur. It was also distinct because there was no reformation here. Mazovia was divided into three voivodeships, each of them divided into lands, each of them divided into counties and all three voivodeships formed part of the larger Greater Poland Province of the Polish Crown. The Polish-Lithuanian Union of Lublin (1569) established Mazovia as the central region of the Polish–Lithuanian Commonwealth, with Warsaw rising to prominence as the seat of the state legislature (sejm). In 1596 King Sigismund III Vasa moved the Polish capital from Kraków to Warsaw. During the 17th and 18th centuries Swedish, Transylvanian, Saxon, and Russian invasions wreaked havoc on the region.

In 1793 western Mazovia, and two years later the rest of the region were annexed by the Kingdom of Prussia in the Second and Third Partitions of Poland, while the south-eastern portion was annexed by Austria. In 1807 it became part of the Duchy of Warsaw. In 1815 the region was incorporated into the Congress Kingdom of Poland, which was dependent on Russia. In the 19th century Mazovia was the site of large Polish uprisings (November Uprising and January Uprising) against Russian rule. In that era pre-partition Mazovia was divided among Warsaw, Płock and Augustów (the last one replaced later by Łomża).

Since 1918 Mazovia has been a part of the resurrected Poland, being roughly equivalent to the Warsaw Voivodeship. Under the German occupation during World War II, the population was subjected to mass arrests, executions, expulsions and deportations to forced labour, Nazi concentration camps and Nazi ghettos. Numerous sites were looted. The large Palmiry massacres were carried out in the village of Palmiry near Warsaw. It is one of the most infamous sites of Nazi German crimes against Poles. The population of Warsaw decreased sharply as a result of executions, the extermination of the city's Jews, the deaths of some 200,000 inhabitants during the Warsaw Uprising of 1944, and the deportation of the city's left-bank population following the uprising. Shortly after the uprising, Adolf Hitler ordered German troops to destroy the city. The rebuilding of the Polish capital was the main task of the postwar period. Those times Warsaw Voivodeship was still roughly similar to historical Mazovia and used to be informally called so, but in 1975 it was divided into several little voivodeships. However, in 1999 Mazovian Voivodeship was created as one of 16 administrative regions of Poland.

Culture

Mazovian dialect

The Mazovian language probably existed as a separate dialect until the 20th century. The ethnonym Mazur has given the name for a phonetic phenomenon known as mazurzenie (although it is common in the Lesser Polish dialect as well).

Local cuisine
There is no specific regional cuisine of Mazovia. Formerly, dairy foods dominated the peasant cuisine. Nobles used poultry, geese, chickens and ducks. The most separate Mazovian culinary regions are Kurpie and Łowicz, where traditional dishes survive to the present day. In Kurpie, traditional dishes are prepared with ingredients collected in the forest: berries, honey and mushrooms. There are several traditional Polish dishes like flaki (tripes), kluski (noodles and dumplings), which are prepared in different way than in other parts of Poland.

Economy
Mazovian Voivodeship is ranked decidedly first in Poland according to the Gross Domestic Product. This is thanks to Warsaw, which is a financial centre of East-Central Europe. The majority of state enterprises are headquartered in this metropolis. It is a hub for both rail and vehicular traffic, with access throughout Poland and across Europe. Warsaw Chopin Airport is the nation's busiest. There are many branches of industry and services well developed in this city. The other economical center is Płock, where large petrochemical plants PKN Orlen operate. The rest of Mazovia belongs to the poorest parts of Poland. In agriculture the most typical Mazovian crops are potatoes and rye, but the most popular (as in the whole of Poland) is wheat. Others are barley, sugar beets, fruits (with their biggest Polish basin in the south of the region), and vegetables. Pigs are commonly bred, often also cows and chickens.

Tourism

Kampinos National Park is one of Poland's largest national parks and is popular with tourists making day trips from Warsaw to hike among the park's primeval forests, sand dunes, and marshland. The main cultural centre of the region, and, alongside Kraków, in all of Poland, is Warsaw, which is home to dozens of theatres, the National Philharmonic, the National Opera House, the National Library, the National Museum, Centrum Nauki Kopernik, Muzeum Powstania Warszawskiego, Temple of Divine Providence, and the Sanctuary of Blessed Jerzy Popiełuszko. Warsaw has many magnificent historic buildings and monuments, including those in the Old Town and the New Town, both of which were almost completely demolished during World War II but were meticulously restored and were designated UNESCO World Heritage sites in 1980. Several important edifices has been built at the adjacent street Krakowskie Przedmieście. There are also royal palaces and gardens of Łazienki and Wilanów. The most interesting building from post-war period is Pałac Kultury i Nauki.

Historical monuments elsewhere include the manor house in Żelazowa Wola where composer Frédéric Chopin was born and his museum is located nowadays. Płock, once the seat of the Mazovian princes, and Łowicz, the residence of the archbishops of Gniezno, are noted for their cathedrals. There are also palaces and parks in Nieborów and Arkadia, the Modlin Fortress, castles in Czersk, Pułtusk, Ciechanów, Opinogóra, Rawa Mazowiecka, Sochaczew and Liw, as well as churches in Niepokalanów, Góra Kalwaria, Warka, Skierniewice, Czerwińsk, Wyszogród, Zakroczym, Szreńsk, Przasnysz, Ostrołęka, Łomża, Szczuczyn, Wizna, Brok, Zuzela, Rostkowo, and Boguszyce. Interesting folklore is found in the subregion of Kurpie; another skansen has been established in Sierpc.

Main cities and towns

The following table lists the cities in Mazovia with a population greater than 20,000 (2015):

Gallery

See also 

 Świdermajer – an architectural style in the area

External links 

 Summer in Mazowsze

References 

 
Historical regions
Historical regions in Poland

he:מזוביה